St Martins and Deritend was a ward of the County Borough of Birmingham. It was abolished in 1949.

Ward Description
The ward covered an area of south central Birmingham, including the districts of Deritend and Bordesley.

Ward History
The ward was created in {}, with the boundaries being unaltered between 1934 and 1949.

Parliamentary Representation
The ward has been part of Birmingham {} constituency.

Politics
The ward was generally a Socialist ward, although it was won by the Tories in the immediate pre-war era.

Election results

1940’s

Former wards of Birmingham, West Midlands